Sir James Theodore Lester (23 May 1932 – 31 October 2021) was a British Conservative Party politician.

Parliamentary career
Born in Nottingham in May 1932, Lester first stood for Parliament in a by-election at Bassetlaw in 1968, when he almost overturned a Labour majority of 10,428 votes, failing to beat Joe Ashton by just 740 votes. He contested the seat again at the 1970 general election, but Ashton stretched his advantage to 8,261 votes.

He was Member of Parliament (MP) for Beeston between February 1974 and 1983, then for Broxtowe until the 1997 election, when he lost his seat to Labour. During his time in the House of Commons, he served as a party whip and a junior employment minister.

Lester died on 31 October 2021, at the age of 89.

References 

1932 births
2021 deaths
Conservative Party (UK) MPs for English constituencies
Knights Bachelor
Politicians from Nottingham
UK MPs 1974
UK MPs 1974–1979
UK MPs 1979–1983
UK MPs 1983–1987
UK MPs 1987–1992
UK MPs 1992–1997